Tetronal is a sedative-hypnotic and anesthetic drug with GABAergic actions. It is not as effective as trional.

History
Tetronal was introduced by Eugen Baumann and Alfred Kast in 1888.

See also
 Sulfonal
 Trional

References

Hypnotics
Sulfones
GABAA receptor positive allosteric modulators